Tosin Damilola Atolagbe (born 4 July 1994) is a Nigerian badminton player.

Achievements

African Championships 
Women's doubles

Mixed doubles

BWF International Challenge/Series 
Women's singles

Women's doubles

Mixed doubles

  BWF International Challenge tournament
  BWF International Series tournament
  BWF Future Series tournament

References

External links 
 

1994 births
Living people
Nigerian female badminton players
Competitors at the 2011 All-Africa Games
Competitors at the 2015 African Games
African Games gold medalists for Nigeria
African Games bronze medalists for Nigeria
African Games medalists in badminton
21st-century Nigerian women